Paul Nicholson (born 10 August 1986 in Whitehaven) is an English retired footballer who played in the United Soccer League from 2011 to 2017.

Career

College and amateur
Nicholson started his career playing for Morecambe under 17 and under 18 team. After being unsuccessful in obtaining a professional contract with the club,  Nicholson moved from to the United States in  2005 after accepting a scholarship to play college soccer at the University of Rio Grande. He was selected a first team All-American in 2008 and first team All-AMC. Nicholson was named in the All Tournament team for the 2008 NAIA Tournament and was tabbed the tournament's Most Valuable Defensive Player. He was honorable mention All-AMC in 2007 and was on the second team in 2006.

During his college career, Nicholson also played with USL Premier Development League club West Virginia Chaos during their 2009 season. He also appeared for USL PDL club GPS Portland Phoenix during their 2010 season.

Professional
Nicholson signed his first professional contract in February 2011, joining USL Pro club Wilmington Hammerheads. He made his professional debut on 17 April 2011 in Wilmington's first game of the 2011 season, a 1–0 win over the Rochester Rhinos, and scored his first professional goal on 29 April, in a 3–2 win over the Pittsburgh Riverhounds.

Wilmington re-signed Nicholson for the 2012 season on 13 February 2012.

After five years with Wilmington, Nicholson signed with FC Cincinnati ahead of their inaugural 2016 season. Following the conclusion of the 2017 season, Nicholson announced his retirement from professional football.

Coaching
Nicholson was the head coach at Cincinnati Dutch Lions FC in the USL League 2. In his first season as head coach the Lions had a 6-4-4 record and finished 3rd in the Great Lakes Division. In his second season has the head coach, in 2019, the Lions finished slightly better with a 6-3-5 record but fell just short of the USL League 2 playoffs. In 2019, Nicholson and the Dutch Lions won the Subway Cup, winning the season series against their rival Dayton Dutch Lions FC. In 2020, he left the club.

In 2021, he became the head coach of USL League Two club Kings Hammer SC.

References

External links
 
 
 Rio Grande profile

1986 births
Living people
English footballers
West Virginia Chaos players
GPS Portland Phoenix players
Wilmington Hammerheads FC players
USL League Two players
USL Championship players
English expatriate sportspeople in the United States
English expatriate footballers
Expatriate soccer players in the United States
FC Cincinnati (2016–18) players
Association football midfielders
USL League Two coaches
Expatriate soccer managers in the United States
English expatriate football managers
Rio Grande RedStorm men's soccer players